Caroline of the Palatinate-Zweibrücken (Caroline Henriette Christiane Philippine Louise; 9 March 1721 – 30 March 1774) was Landgravine of Hesse-Darmstadt by marriage to Louis IX, Landgrave of Hesse-Darmstadt. She was famed as one of the most learned women of her time and known as The Great Landgräfin.

Biography
Henriette Caroline was the daughter of Christian III, Duke of Zweibrücken and his wife Caroline of Nassau-Saarbrücken.

She married on 12 August 1741 in Zweibrücken, Louis IX, Landgrave of Hesse-Darmstadt. The marriage was arranged and unhappy: Caroline was interested in music and literature, while her consort was interested in military matters, and she lived separated from him at Buchsweiler. She founded a factory to ease the states economy. In 1772, she promoted the politician Friedrich Karl von Moser.

Caroline was better known as The Great Landgräfin, a name given to her by Johann Wolfgang von Goethe. She befriended several writers and philosophers of her time, such as Johann Gottfried Herder, Christoph Martin Wieland and Goethe. Wieland wished he had the power to make her Queen of Europa. She also had contact with Frederick II of Prussia. She was one of the few women that the Alte Fritz respected, and he famously referred to her as the Glory and Wonder of our century; after her death, he sent an urn to Darmstadt with the text femina sexo, ingenio vir ('A woman by sex, a man by spirit').

She and her husband became the most recent common ancestors of all current European monarchs in 2022 after the death of Queen Elizabeth II of the United Kingdom, who was not a descendant; her son, Charles III – a descendant through his father – succeeded her as the King.

Issue

Ancestry

Literature
Marita A. Panzer: Die Große Landgräfin Caroline von Hessen-Darmstadt, Verlag Friedrich Pustet Regensburg, 2005

References

External links

Karoline Henriette Christine Pfalzgräfin von Zweibrücken-Birkenfeld at thepeerage.com
Wikisource: Allgemeine Deutsche Biographie "Karoline Landgräfin von Hessen-Darmstadt" (in German)

|-

|-

1721 births
1774 deaths
House of Palatinate-Zweibrücken
People from Strasbourg
Landgravines of Hesse-Darmstadt
Countesses Palatine of Zweibrücken
Daughters of monarchs